The 2020–21 FC Utrecht season was the club's 51st season in existence and the 51st consecutive season in the top flight of Dutch football. In addition to the domestic league, FC Utrecht participated in this season's editions of the KNVB Cup. In the regular season, they have qualified for the play-offs, for this they played for a place in the second round of the Conference League.

Players

First-team squad

Transfers

Summer

Transfers in

Transfers out

Winter

Transfers in

Transfers out

Pre-season and friendlies

Competitions

Overview

Eredivisie

League table

Results summary

Results by round

Matches
The league fixtures were announced on 24 July 2020.

Play-offs Conference League

KNVB Cup

Statistics

Goalscorers

Assists

Attendance

References

External links

FC Utrecht seasons
FC Utrecht